Master Mixes is a remix EP by Duran Duran. This double 12" compilation was released commercially in the United States by Capitol under the production label of Masterdisk Corporation and in Brazil by EMI in 1987.

The track listing for each release differed slightly but featured the same unreleased material, remixes of Notorious album tracks, "Vertigo (Do the Demolition)" and "American Science". The releases close with a megamix entitled "Notoriousaurus Rex".

In time for the US leg of the Strange Behaviour Tour in June and July, Masterdisc released this Master Mixes collection, compiled unused remixes from their 1986 album Notorious, as well as a further mixes of "Skin Trade" and a megamix called "Notoriousaurus Rex".

Track listing

2x12": Masterdisk / VB-15320-1/2 (US) 
 "American Science" (Chemical Reaction Mix) – 7:51
 "Vertigo (Do The Demolition)" (Mantronix Mix) – 6:35
 "Skin Trade" (Parisian Mix) – 8:10
 "American Science" (Meltdown Dub) – 7:33
 "Vertigo (Do the Demolition)" (B-Boy Mix) – 6:07
 "Notoriousaurus Rex" (Master Mix) – 8:15

12": EMI / 064 748956 1 (Brazil) 
 "Meet El Presidente" – 7:12
 "American Science" (Chemical Reaction Mix) – 7:51
 "Skin Trade" (Parisian Mix) – 8:10
 "Vertigo (Do the Demolition)" (Mantronix Mix) – 6:35
 "Notorious" (Latin Rascals Mix) – 6:21
 "Notoriousaurus Rex" (Master Mix) – 8:15

Remixers

Justin Strauss & Murray Elias 
 "American Science" (Chemical Reaction Mix) – 7:51
 "American Science" (Meltdown Dub) – 7:33

Kurtis Mantronik 
 "Vertigo (Do the Demolition)" (Mantronix Mix) – 6:35
 "Vertigo (Do the Demolition)" (B-Boy Mix) – 6:07

Daniel Abraham 
 "Skin Trade" (Parisian Mix) – 8:10

The Latin Rascals 
 "Notorious" (Latin Rascals Mix) – 6:21

Mark S. Berry 
 "Meet El Presidente" – 7:18

Notes 
In 1999, EMI released a collection of remixes under the title Strange Behaviour and included the "American Science (Chemical Reaction Mix)", giving the mix its first truly commercial release. The other remix of "American Science" and the Kurtis Mantronik mixes of "Vertigo" have yet to receive a commercial release. Neither has the "Notoriousaurus Rex (Master Mix)".

Duran Duran albums
1987 EPs
1987 remix albums
Remix EPs